Switch is a 2007 Norwegian snowboard film. The main actors are Sebastian Stigar, Ida Elise Broch, Peter Stormare and Hilde Lyrån. The film was nominated to an Amanda for the best youth film, but ended up at second place, beaten by Mannen som elsket Yngve (The man who loved Yngve).

References

External links

2007 films
Norwegian sports films
2000s Norwegian-language films
2007 action films
2007 drama films
2000s sports films